The R302 is a Regional Route in South Africa that connects Bellville with Malmesbury.

Route
The route begins at an intersection with the R102 (Voortrekker Road) in Bellville. It runs along Durban Road, which soon splits into two one-way roads, the northbound road becoming Willie van Schoor Avenue while the southbound remains Durban Road. It crosses the N1 freeway at exit 23. The two directions rejoin at Tyger Valley and continue to Durbanville as Durbanville Avenue and then Main Road. In Durbanville Central the route turns right and runs along Wellington Road before leaving the built-up area. At Fisantekraal it passes the western end of the R312, and at Klipheuwel it crosses and briefly overlaps the R304. It enters Malmesbury along Voortrekker Road, passing the eastern end of the R315 (Bokomo Road) before ending at the R45 (Piet Retief Street).

References

External links
 
 Routes Travel Info

Regional Routes in the Western Cape